Tina Kindvall is a Swedish former footballer. Kindvall was part of the Djurgården Swedish champions' team of 2003. She is the daughter of Ove Kindvall and sister of Niclas Kindvall.

Honours 
 Djurgården/Älvsjö 
 Damallsvenskan: 2003

References

Swedish women's footballers
Djurgårdens IF Fotboll (women) players
Women's association footballers not categorized by position
Year of birth missing (living people)